The Iran International Tournament or simply known as Iran Cup was a friendly football tournament held in Tehran, Iran between July 11 and July 20, 1975. This was the second edition, the first edition was 1974 Iran International Tournament.

Seven teams participated in this edition: Iran national football team A & B, Egypt national football team, Zaire national football team,
USSR U23, Poland U23 and the club side FK Teplice from Czechoslovakia.

Group stage
Group A

Group B

Semi finals

Third place match

Final

Top scorers

Squads

Iran A

Head Coach:   Frank O'Farrell

Iran B national football team

Head Coach:   Heshmat Mohajerani

USSR U23

Poland U23

Egypt

Head Coach:   Burkhard Pape

Zaire

Head Coach:   Ștefan Stănculescu

FK Teplice

References

1975
1975
1975–76 in Iranian football
1975–76 in Czechoslovak football
1975–76 in Polish football
1975 in Soviet football
1975 in African football